Guy-Roland Kpene (born November 23, 1983 in Abidjan) is an Ivorian footballer, currently playing for the Long Island Rough Riders.

Career

Youth and college
After playing in the youth team of local Ivorian side CSP Cocody, Kpene moved with his family to the United States in 2003 when his mother accepted the job as Ivory Coast's finance attache to the United Nations in New York.

Kpene played one season of college soccer at Westchester Community College, earning all-region honors, before being recruited by Dowling College. He helped the Golden Lions to a 22-0-2 season and Dowling’s first National Title. Kpene was Dowling's leading scorer, the first Dowling men’s soccer player to be drafted by MLS, and only the fourth Golden Lion to be drafted in any sport. In his final season, he totaled 25 goals (including seven game-winning goals) and 10 assists. He was named to the 2006 NSCAA/adidas NCAA Division II Men's Collegiate All-American (second team) and earned ECAC Offensive Player of the Week and All-Conference honors. He graduated with a degree in finance.

In 2005, Kpene started all 19 games for the Golden Lions and led the team with 33 points and 13 goals (5 game winning).  He was second on the team with 7 assists. Kpene was named to the All-NYCAC First Team and the NSCAA/adidas All Northeast Region First Team.

During his college years Kpene also played for the Brooklyn Knights in the USL Premier Development League, scoring 6 goals in 9 appearances in 2006.

Professional
Kpene was selected in the third round, 37th overall, by D.C. United in the 2007 MLS Supplemental Draft. He made his first MLS start on May 6, 2007 against Chivas USA, and assisted on the first goal by Christian Gomez to give the team the lead.

After being releaded by D.C. United during preseason, Kpene signed with the Houston Dynamo on May 7, 2008, having practiced with the team from mid-April and played in the team's April 20 reserve game as a guest player.  He was released following the 2008 season.

In 2009 Kpene went to Europe to pursue his career. He was with Bundesliga 2 side FSV Frankfurt, and with several teams in Belgium,

In 2011 Kpene, having returned to the United States, signed with the Long Island Rough Riders in the USL Premier Development League. He scored a goal for the Rough Riders on his debut on May 21, 2011, a 3-1 win over Jersey Express.

Honors

D.C. United
Major League Soccer Supporter's Shield (1): 2007

References

External links
Dowling College Bio
Feature on Kpene by Steven Goff, Washington Post
Kpene on jersey numbers in Dan Steinberg's Washington Post Sports Bog

1983 births
Living people
Brooklyn Knights players
D.C. United players
Houston Dynamo FC players
Long Island Rough Riders players
Ivorian footballers
Footballers from Abidjan
USL League Two players
Major League Soccer players
D.C. United draft picks
Association football forwards